Xyliphius barbatus is a species of banjo catfish that is endemic to Argentina where it is found in the Paraguay-Paraná River system basin.  It grows to a length of 9.2 cm.

References 
 

Aspredinidae
Freshwater fish of Argentina
Endemic fauna of Argentina
Fish described in 1962